De Ridder is a Dutch surname, meaning "the knight". It may refer to:

People
Alexandra Simons de Ridder (born 1963), German equestrian
Alfons de Ridder (1882–1960), Flemish writer and poet
Allard de Ridder (1887–1966), Dutch and Canadian conductor, violist, and composer
André de Ridder (born 1971), German music conductor 
Chantal de Ridder (born 1989), Dutch footballer
Daniël de Ridder (born 1984), Dutch footballer
Daniela De Ridder (born 1962), German politician
Dirk de Ridder (sailor) (born 1972), Dutch competitive sailor
Gaspard Deridder (1918–1977), Belgian boxer
Hilde De Ridder-Symoens (born 1943), Dutch historian
Johan de Ridder (born 1927), South African architect
Louis De Ridder (1902–1981), Belgian winter sports athlete
Luis de Ridder (1928–2004), Argentine alpine skier
Marcello de Ridder (born 1921), Argentine bobsledder
Minneke De Ridder (born 1980), Belgian politician
 (born 1948), Belgian historian and politician
Peter de Ridder (born 1946), Dutch  businessman and sailor
Philippe De Ridder (born 1964), Belgian football player, coach, and administrator
Reinier De Ridder (born 1990), Dutch mixed martial artist 
Steve De Ridder (born 1987), Belgian footballer
Willem de Ridder (born 1939), Dutch artist and anarchist

Other
DeRidder, Louisiana, a place named for Ella de Ridder, the sister-in-law of a Dutch railroad financier

Dutch-language surnames
Occupational surnames